Fender's blue butterfly (Icaricia icarioides fenderi) is an endangered subspecies of Boisduval's blue (Icaricia icarioides) endemic to the Willamette Valley of northwestern Oregon, United States. The potential range of the butterfly extends from south and west of Portland, OR to south of Eugene, OR. The butterfly is host-specific on the Kincaid's lupine, which it relies on for reproduction and growth.

History
The subspecies was first documented in the 1920s and was described to science in 1931 by biologist Ralph Macy, who named it for his friend, Kenneth Fender, an entomologist and mail carrier. The subspecies was not seen after the 1930s and was presumed extinct. Small populations were rediscovered in 1989. Its eponym, Fender, had died nine years earlier.

Ecology

Host plant
Fender's blue butterfly is host-specific on Kincaid's lupine (Lupinus sulphureus kincaidii), a rare subspecies of the common sulphur lupine. The adult deposits its eggs on the plant in spring. After emerging and feeding, the larva winters in the root system. In spring it continues to feed before undergoing metamorphosis. As an adult it lives for no more than three weeks, during which time it mates and the female seeks Kincaid's lupines on which to oviposit.

As Fender's blue prefer to feed on the lupine's flowers, reduction in lupine availability limits the butterfly's food sources and distribution. Females in particular prefer native nectar, with a study by Thomas and Schultz finding only 20% of nectar was obtained from nonnative plants.

Mutualism
Fender's blue butterfly has been observed to participate in facultative mutualism with several species of ant, including Prenolepis imparis and Aphaenogaster occidentalis. Butterfly larvae that received attendance from ants were observed to have higher survival rates compared to those that did not.

Habitat destruction
Fender's blue butterfly is endemic to the Willamette Valley in Oregon, where its habitat is fragmented into 13 sections. Observation of butterfly dispersion and flight patterns revealed that butterflies tend to prefer prairie patches with Kincaid's lupine. As fragmentation increases the distance between lupine patches, the butterflies face habitat loss due to the lack of ability to fly from one patch to another. The increasing presence of anthropogenic structures, agriculture, and urbanization threaten habitat fragmentation, as roads can prevent movement and introduce mortality risk from vehicles.

Conservation
In January 2000, Fender's blue butterfly was added to the Endangered Species List by the U.S. Fish and Wildlife Service. The largest known populations now exist in the Baskett Slough National Wildlife Refuge. A 2014 study reintroduced this subspecies to William L. Finley National Wildlife Refuge.

Fender's blue butterfly is a protected species in The Nature Conservancy's Willow Creek Preserve in Eugene, which extends into the Willamette Valley. Controlled burning of prairie habitats is practiced in the preserve to maximize butterfly population growth.

References

External links
Fender's blue butterfly (Icaricia icarioides fenderi). US Fish and Wildlife Service.
Species Fact Sheet: Fender's blue butterfly (Icaricia icarioides fenderi). Oregon Office, US Fish and Wildlife Service. 
Double jeopardy: Endangered butterfly depends on endangered plants. Environmental News Network. CNN.com June 26, 2000.

Icaricia
Fauna of the Northwestern United States
Natural history of Oregon
ESA endangered species
Butterfly subspecies
Endemic flora of Oregon